Standing on the shoulders of giants is a metaphor.

Standing on the shoulders of giants may also refer to:

Standing on the Shoulders of Giants (Tribe of Gypsies album), 2000
Standing on the Shoulder of Giants, a 2000 album by Oasis

See also
 On the Shoulders of Giants (disambiguation)